The General Atomics MQ-20 Avenger (formerly Predator C) is a developmental unmanned combat aerial vehicle built by General Atomics Aeronautical Systems for the U.S. military.

Design and development

Unlike the previous MQ-1 Predator and MQ-9 Reaper (Predator B) drones, the Avenger is powered by a turbofan engine, and its design includes stealth features such as internal weapons storage and an S-shaped exhaust for reduced infrared and radar signatures.
 
Its first flight occurred on 4 April 2009.

The Avenger will support the same weapons as the MQ-9, and carry the Lynx synthetic aperture radar and a version of the F-35 Lightning II's electro-optical targeting system (EOTS), called the Advanced Low-observable Embedded Reconnaissance Targeting (ALERT) system. The Avenger will use the same ground support infrastructure as the MQ-1 and MQ-9, including the ground control station and existing communications networks.

Operational history

Flight testing
The first flight of the first prototype Avenger occurred on 4 April 2009 at the company's Grey Butte Field Airport Flight Operations Facility in Palmdale, California. The aircraft took off and landed without any discrepancies and was ready to fly again once refueled. Following flights were performed successfully on 13 and 14 April. The second prototype Avenger performed its first flight on 12 January 2012, meeting all performance objectives and refining the first prototype design to an operational capability. The Tail 2 prototype featured a four-foot longer fuselage to accommodate larger payloads and more fuel.

On 15 February 2012, the Air Force cancelled its MQ-X program, which was supposed to find an aircraft to replace the MQ-9 Reaper. The Sea Avenger variant was part of the Navy's cancelled Unmanned Carrier-Launched Airborne Surveillance and Strike (UCLASS) program.

On 15 November 2012, the Avenger flew for three hours while being controlled by the General Atomics Advanced Cockpit Ground Control Station (GCS).  The Advanced Cockpit GCS has a wrap-around visual display and multi-dimensional moving map to increase situational awareness and reduce pilot workload.  The Advanced Cockpit GCS has flown an MQ-1 Predator and is planned to fly an MQ-9 Reaper as part of an Air Force initiative to enable interoperability with all USAF Remote Piloted Aircraft (RPA).

In July 2013, a third Avenger was scheduled to begin flight testing. Assembly of the fourth Avenger was expected to be finished by spring 2014.

Since its first flight in 2009, the Avenger has completed more than 13,000 flight hours, reaching 11,000 hours in July 2016 and accumulating most of those hours within the past three years.

Potential deployments
In December 2011, it was reported that the Air Force had ordered an Avenger and that it would be deployed to Afghanistan.  "This aircraft will be used as a test asset and will provide a significantly increased weapons and sensors payload capacity on an aircraft that will be able to fly to targets much more rapidly than the MQ-9 [Reaper] UAS," the USAF said in an announcement. "Since it has an internal weapons bay and four hardpoints on each wing it will also allow greater flexibility and will accommodate a large selection of next generation sensor and weapons payloads." 

The aircraft ordered was the original Tail 1 prototype version. This announcement sparked rumors that the aircraft would be deployed to monitor neighboring Iran and Pakistan.  These allegations were made because the Avenger is stealthy, while the battlespace over Afghanistan is free of radar guided missiles, as well as any other anti-aircraft weapons.  The announcement also came two weeks after the Iran-US RQ-170 incident.  The Air Force responded by clarifying that the purchase was initiated in July of that year, well before the incident. 

However, the Air Force later clarified that the Avenger was being purchased only as a test asset, and that it was not being sent to Afghanistan.  Discrepancies in the solicitation are believed to have caused the misinterpretation. After testing, the Air Force decided that the Avenger version they evaluated offered only modest improvements over the MQ-9 in terms of speed, payload, and reduced signature, and didn't meet survivability and reliability requirements to survive in contested environments needed to warrant buying a new aircraft of the type.

With the Taliban takeover of Afghanistan in 2021, the US has lost access to airbases inside the country that are necessary for striking targets in neighboring Pakistan. Due to the longer distances from potential targets, General Atomics has pitched the Avenger to the Central Intelligence Agency as a better drone for the mission.  The jet-powered Avenger can fly  from its operating base and stay airborne for 18 hours.

Export

Canada
General Atomics has offered the Predator C Avenger to Canada as a contender for its Joint Unmanned Surveillance and Target Acquisition System (JUSTAS) armed UAV project. In 2016, the JUSTAS project was prioritized by the Royal Canadian Air Force (RCAF) and Liberal government. The RCAF has requested that the drones be armed, therefore making the General Atomics Avenger the only suitable contender, as the Northrop Grumman RQ-4 Global Hawk is unarmed. 

Following a formal Invitation to Qualify issued by the Government of Canada, only General Atomics and L3 Technologies MAS were selected as being qualified suppliers allowed to submit a bid. Canada will begin to refine the preliminary requirements with General Atomics and L3 Technologies until a formal request for proposals and contract is awarded.

India
On 22 September 2015, the U.S. stated they backed India's membership in the Missile Technology Control Regime, which would enable them to buy armed drones.  Two days later, the Indian Air Force sent a letter to General Atomics saying it wanted to purchase the Avenger.

As of 17 August 2017, General Atomics Aeronautical Systems (GA-ASI) is in the early stages of negotiating the potential sale of as many as 100 Predator C Avenger remotely piloted aircraft to an unidentified international customer. The renewed international interest is believed to be led by India, which has requested access to the capability as a potential follow-on to the planned acquisition of as many as 20 GA-ASI MQ-9 UAVs, 10 each for its Army and Navy and wants to acquire 100 Avenger drones for its Air Force at the cost of $8 Billion.

Variants
MQ-20 US military designation for the Avenger

Sea Avenger
On 3 May 2010, GA-ASI introduced Sea Avenger, a carrier-based derivative of the Predator C Avenger UAS, intended to fulfill the U.S. Navy's need for an Unmanned Carrier-Launched Airborne Surveillance and Strike (UCLASS). The Sea Avenger included a retractable electro-optical/infrared sensor, internal weapons bay, and folding wings. The aircraft's structure was designed with the flexibility to accommodate carrier suitable landing gear, tailhook, drag devices, and other provisions for carrier operations.

In April 2014, General Atomics displayed images of the Sea Avenger at the Navy League Sea Air and Space exposition.  As requirements for the UCLASS program were altered from a high-end strike aircraft to an ISR machine operating in permissive environments, the Sea Avenger was modified accordingly.  It appeared to have four external hardpoints and a small weapons bay, a wing-mounted buddy-refueling store to perform as an aerial tanker, and a larger airframe with a larger engine.

If Navy requirements favored a UAV optimized for permissive ISR over broadband stealth, the Sea Avenger would better meet them, as it was originally pitched as having a reduced signature to be "stealthier" than other aircraft.  Sea Avenger stealth capabilities seemed to be limited to higher frequencies like C, X, and Ku bands, instead of broadband stealth effective against low-frequency radar bands like VHF and UHF.

In October 2017, General Atomics released images of its submission for the Navy's MQ-25 Stingray, an unmanned aerial tanker that formed out of the UCLASS effort. The aircraft is an Avenger-based wing-body-tail design with a standard D-704 buddy tank refueling system that has an electro-optical ball like the Predator and Reaper, landing gear that pulls into the fuselage, and a system for maneuvering around the flight deck using gestures from the flight crew.

GA-ASI's design is larger than the Sea Avenger and is powered by the Pratt & Whitney PW815 high-bypass turbofan, the same engine used on the Gulfstream G600. Generating  of thrust, it is four times more powerful than the Predator C's PW545B turbofan, and the most powerful engine used by any Stingray competitor. In addition to structural reinforcements and additional systems for carrier operations, the aircraft is fitted with the same landing gear and arresting hook as the Super Hornet and has space available for future growth to perform ISR and strike missions; it would be able to fuel four to six aircraft.

The MQ-25 contract was awarded to Boeing in August 2018.

Avenger ER
On 27 October 2016, General Atomics Aeronautical Systems, Inc. (GA-ASI) conducted the maiden flight of the Avenger ER.

The modifications extend its endurance from the original 15 hours to 20 hours. The Avenger ER uses a modified fuselage design (completed in 2012) extended by four feet (to ) to accommodate larger payloads and more fuel. Earlier in 2016, the U.S. Federal Aviation Administration granted GA-ASI an experimental certificate that allows it to fly the Avenger in the National Airspace System. 

From 24–25 January 2018, an Avenger ER set a new endurance record of 23.4 continuous hours, exceeding the 20 hour flight test goal and reflecting a 10-hour improvement over the baseline Predator C Avenger. The Avenger ER also has an increased maximum gross takeoff weight (MGTOW) of  using a co-cured composite center wing and heavyweight landing gear as well as a dual redundant, light weight brake control capability using a lightweight hybrid linear anti-lock brake system.

Operators

 United States Air Force - one aircraft
 Unidentified U.S. government customer – up to seven aircraft

Specifications

See also

References

External links
 Predator C Avenger Makes First Flights
 Photo: Avenger UAV
 Avenger UAV, GA-ASI.com
 Avenger – A Stealthy Predator C Combat UAV from General Atomics

Stealth aircraft
Avenger
2000s United States military reconnaissance aircraft
Single-engined jet aircraft
Mid-wing aircraft
V-tail aircraft
Signals intelligence
War on terror
General Atomics Avenger
Synthetic aperture radar
Unmanned stealth aircraft